"Sleepless in Peckham...!" is the final episode of BBC sitcom Only Fools and Horses. It was first screened on 25 December 2003 as the third and final part of the early 2000s Christmas trilogy, and as the eighteenth and final Christmas special. It was the last Only Fools and Horses-related episode until the Sport Relief special in March 2014.

Plot

All seems calm and peaceful at Nelson Mandela House. Cassandra is in the late stages of pregnancy, which means Rodney will finally become a father. Del Boy takes Raquel's washing-up gloves and drives to the cemetery to clean the monument of his and Rodney's mother Joan. It is revealed that after they became millionaires, the Trotters used some of their money to give their mother's grave a makeover.

Later, at The Nag's Head, Sid tells Trigger (who has been creating a portable backscratcher made of chopsticks) that he got some suggestions from Mike on how to make the pub look a lot better. He also shows Rodney, Trigger and Mickey Pearce an old photograph of the first Jolly Boys' Outing in 1960. Sid mentions that there were no more because the coach company refused to do business with them after the events of the last one. They also notice that Marlene has been mysteriously absent for several weeks. Mickey and Sid quickly believe that Boycie killed her.

Back at the flat, Del helps Rodney with an idea for a film about Mel Gibson and Julia Roberts crashing an aeroplane on an uninhabited island of cavepeople, including Fred Flintstone and Barney Rubble. The next day, the Trotter Brothers and Trigger find Denzil at a pizzeria and ask him if he has run off with Marlene. Denzil says that he has not seen Marlene recently either but has been in hospital getting treatment for haemorrhoids. This prompts Del and Rodney to go straight to Boycie and ask him if he murdered his wife and buried her in the garden. The Trotter Brothers arrive at Boycie's house and ask him, and he replies that he did not murder Marlene since she is home and upstairs asleep. Boycie promises that he will bring Marlene with him to the Nag's Head that night. That night, at the Nag's Head, Boycie arrives with Marlene, who shows everybody that the reason she was absent for the last couple of weeks was to get her chest surgically enhanced. Raquel wisecracks at the sight of it, and Boycie and Marlene are tricked by Sid into paying for everyone's drinks. The next day, Rodney and Raquel berate Del because they are nowhere near the total sum of money that they owe the Inland Revenue. Del is deeply hurt when Raquel tells him, "only women bleed", and he angrily recounts his own life of having to take care of both Rodney and Grandad after their father abandoned them. As Raquel goes to lie down, Del privately says to Rodney that if they do get evicted, then he and Raquel will go their separate ways, but Del and Raquel are reconciled shortly after.

With only a few days left before the Trotters are evicted from Nelson Mandela House, Rodney gets an enlarged copy of the 1960 Jolly Boys' Outing photo and shows it to Cassandra at a restaurant. He shows her who was in the photo: Del, Boycie, Trigger, Denzil, Sid, Roy Slater, Grandad, Reg – and local gentleman thief Freddie "The Frog" Robdal (pictured as Nicholas Lyndhurst), who bears an uncanny resemblance to Rodney. Rodney tells Cassandra that Robdal is his real biological father, explaining the affair Robdal had with Rodney and Del's mother Joan. Meanwhile, back at the flat, after returning from the market, Del finds the original photo and concludes that Rodney has learned the horrible truth. Del tells Raquel about how he only knew Robdal as "Uncle Fred" in the 1960s, and mentions that only Joan, Uncle Albert, and Trigger's aunt Reenie Turpin knew that Robdal was Rodney's real father. Del did have his suspicions for many years but did not believe it until Albert told him after getting drunk at a wet corset contest sometime after "The Frog's Legacy". Del refused to tell Rodney the truth about his parentage out of fear of breaking his brother's heart. Raquel and Cassandra both ask Del and Rodney why they will not tell each other. The Trotter brothers answer that it would indeed break the other's heart.

The next morning, Del and Rodney are called to see a solicitor named Mr. Cartwright, thinking that he will charge them with fraud since they failed to pay the Inland Revenue. But Mr. Cartwright brings good news to the Trotter brothers. After reading a copy of Albert's will, the Trotters discover that Albert never spent his share of the Trotter fortune but invested it in a far more stable area prior to his death, while his nephews invested their shares in the Central American market. According to his will, Albert wanted to give his enlarged share of the fortune to his nephews, leaving them with £145,000 each. Del and Rodney are both stunned by all this, until Del gets a phone call from Raquel telling him that Cassandra has gone into labour. Del and Rodney race to the hospital, where Cassandra has delivered a baby girl via Caesarean section.

A few days later, Rodney takes his daughter to the cemetery to visit his mother's grave. He looks up to the heavens and voices his hope that she and Freddie the Frog really loved each other. He notes his regret that he never really knew her, as well as his hope that his daughter will grow up to be like her. As Del pulls up, Rodney then says that if she ever sees Albert, Joan should tell him that Rodney and Del said thanks. Del arrives and asks Rodney if he came up with a name for his daughter. Rodney hints at Del to look at their mother's grave, which now reads: "Here lies Joan Mavis Trotter. Fell asleep 12 March 1964. Wife of Reg. Mother of Del Boy and Rodney. Grandmother of Damien and Joan." As they prepare to leave the cemetery, Rodney asks Del if he is anything like his father, Freddie the Frog. Del replies firmly by saying that Robdal was "a womaniser, a home-breaker, a con-man, a thief, a liar, and a cheat... So, no Rodney, you're nothing like him." The Trotter Brothers then leave the cemetery and drive home to Nelson Mandela House with a new Joan Trotter in the world. Rodney also announces that he has no intention of continuing to write his movie, which Del agrees is a good idea.

Episode cast

Music
 Westlife: "Uptown Girl"
 Backstreet Boys: "I Want It That Way"
 Atomic Kitten: "Eternal Flame"
 Steps: "Chain Reaction"
 Toploader: "Dancing in the Moonlight"
 Stereophonics: "Have a Nice Day"
 Travis: "Sing"
 Richard Ashcroft: "A Song for the Lovers"

References

External links

2003 British television episodes
British television series finales
British Christmas television episodes
Only Fools and Horses special episodes